Five Point Plan was a San Francisco based band with a mixed music style of funk, acid jazz, hip hop, and soul. They released their debut album "Five Point Plan" in 1999 which was followed by the critically acclaimed second album "Rare" in 2002. UK indie label Café de Soul included tracks from the band on their compilation album, "Rare" was released by Japanese label P-Vine Records. Vocalist Latrice Barnett made the first step in her solo career by releasing the album "Illuminate" in 2006 and touring with the band Galactic in 2008.

In 2015, Barnett and keyboardist Jordan Glasgow launched a new Motown/Nashville-inspired soul project, entitled Loveseat Congregation. The group released an EP ""Real Talk"' in 2016.

Discography

Studio albums

 Five Point Plan (1999)
 Rare (2002)

Band members

 Latrice Barnett - vocal
 Tim Carter - drums
 Michael Cruz - bass
 Jordan Glasgow - keyboards
 David Metzner - guitar

External links
Five Point Plan on CDBaby
Jordan Glasgow's official site
Loveseat Congregation on Bandcamp

Musical groups from San Francisco